JJ Whitehead is a Canadian born stand-up comedian, who was based in the United Kingdom until 2014. He lives in Hollywood, California. He has made appearances at 14 Edinburgh Festival Fringes including 7 solo shows.

Stand-up
In 2000 Whitehead was the winner of the BBC New Comedy Award 
That year he was also a finalist for The Daily Telegraph Comedy Award at the Edinburgh Festival Fringe.

JJ Whitehead has had several TV appearances on Live at The Comedy Store in the UK and internationally he has appeared on The New Zealand Comedy Festival Gala, Raw Comedy in Sweden, and The World Comedy Tour in Australia.

Whitehead performed on an episode of the BBC Radio 4 show 28 Acts in 28 Minutes.

Whitehead grew up in Cole Harbour, Nova Scotia.

Edinburgh Fringe shows

References

External links
Jason John Whitehead official site
Chortle profile

Canadian stand-up comedians
Year of birth missing (living people)
Living people
Stand Up! Records artists